The WNBL Defensive Player of the Year Award is an annual Women's National Basketball League (WNBL) award given since the 1990 WNBL season to the best defensive player throughout the regular season. Since 2000, the award has been known as the Robyn Maher Defensive Player of the Year (commonly known as the Maher Medal). Emily McInerny has won the award nine times, while Tully Bevilaqua has won it on four occasions.

Winners

Multi-time winners

See also 
 WNBL All-Star Five
 WNBL Most Valuable Player Award
 WNBA Defensive Player of the Year Award
 NBL Best Defensive Player Award
 Australia women's national basketball team

References 

Defensive